Clinidium mathani is a species of ground beetle in the subfamily Rhysodinae. It was described by Antoine Henri Grouvelle in 1903. It is named after collector of the holotype, M. de Mathan.

Clinidium mathani measure  in length.

References

Clinidium
Beetles of South America
Insects of Brazil
Arthropods of Colombia
Beetles described in 1903